Braunfels may refer to:
 Braunfels, Germany
 New Braunfels, Texas
 New Braunfels Municipal Airport
 Solms-Braunfels (1258–1806), principality of the Holy Roman Empire
 Amalia of Solms-Braunfels (1602–1675), German noblewoman
 Prince Carl of Solms-Braunfels (1812–1875), German prince
 Walter Braunfels (1882–1954), German composer